Jac Holzman (born September 15, 1931) is an American music businessman, the founder, chief executive officer and head of record label Elektra Records and Nonesuch Records. Holzman  helped commercially launch the CD and home video formats, as well as the pilot program which became MTV. He was inducted into the Rock and Roll Hall of Fame in 2011.

Biography

Early life
Holzman was born to a Jewish family, the son of a Manhattan doctor.  He founded Elektra Entertainment as a small independent folk label in his St. John's College dormitory room in 1950, with $600 ($ in  dollars). That same year the first record released was New Songs by John Gruen, initially a flop but a big learning lesson, 500 copies were pressed with less than a quarter of them were sold. He held Amateur Radio callsign K2VEH around this time. In 1968, he approved Elektra Record's Paxton Lodge, the experimental recording studio where Jackson Browne first recorded. By 1957 Elektra was $90,000 ($ in  dollars) in debt, but finally having success with folk artist Theodore Bikel got them out of it.

Career
He signed such acts as The Doors, Queen (US only), Love, Josh White, Tim Buckley, Carly Simon, the Stooges, MC5, Harry Chapin, and Bread to Elektra and discovered folk singer Judy Collins. In 1964, Holzman served as executive producer for 13 stock sound effect libraries titled Authentic Sound Effects which generated $1.5 million ($ in  dollars) in sales giving Elektra further financial security, that same year he also founded Nonesuch Records as a classical music budget label.
In 1970 he merged his music interests with Warner Communications (then known as Kinney International) over a $10 million deal ($ in  dollars) and continued his association with the labels he created for three additional years. While a part of the Warner Music Group, Holzman helped to establish both the WEA Distributing Corp (Warner-Elektra-Atlantic Distributing Corp) and WEA International.

In 1973, Holzman was appointed senior vice president and chief technologist for WCI.  Holzman guided the company into home video and the first interactive cable television system, QUBE. Until 1972, he was a director of Pioneer Electronics Japan, helping that company, and Warner Bros., adopt the compact disc and Laserdisc. Holzman was a member of the board of Atari, one of the first videogame companies, which was acquired by WCI in 1976, during this time the revolutionary Atari 2600 was released.

In 1979, Holzman became the nexus between ex-Monkee Michael Nesmith and John Lack of Warner Cable.  He persuaded Lack to meet with Nesmith who had been nursing an idea for a program he called PopClips. Holzman thought that Nesmith's notion of building a TV structure around that idea made real sense.

In 1982, following the death of President and founder Robert Gottschalk, Holzman took charge of Panavision, a wholly owned subsidiary of Warner Bros. Discovery and turned that financially troubled company around.

In 1986 he formed FirstMedia, an investment firm which acquired Cinema Products Corporation, the maker of the Oscar-winning Steadicam camera stabilization system.

In 1991, through FirstMedia, Holzman acquired the Discovery, Trend and Musicraft jazz labels from the estate of Albert Marx, which was also acquired by Warner Music Group in 1993.

After Edgar Bronfman Jr. and a group of investors acquired Warner Music Group from Time Warner Inc. in 2004, Bronfman brought Holzman back to WMG, reuniting him with the company that he had helped to found with Ahmet Ertegun and Mo Ostin. Although Holzman's work at Warner Music covers a range from mentoring executives and future planning, his first project was the creation of an on-line label, Cordless Recordings, introduced in late 2005. Cordless gave bands space to hone their art and grow without the expectations and cash outlays associated with a major label.

Current

In April 2016, Steve Cooper, CEO of Warner Music Group, announced Jac Holzman as the Senior Technology Advisor to WMG: “a wide-ranging technology ‘scout’, exploring new digital developments and identifying possible partners.”

In June 2018, Holzman launched a new venture named Cosmic Ringtones & Sonic Realms... Your Universe Is Calling. Curated and produced by Holzman, the collection included a series of instrumental pieces composed, performed, and recorded by his son Adam. The album was released on Holzman's FM Group Music label, distributed by ADA.

Awards and honours

In 2008, Holzman received the NARAS Grammy Trustees Award.

On December 15, 2010, it was announced that Holzman would be awarded the Ahmet Ertegun Award (along with Specialty Records founder Art Rupe) by the Rock and Roll Hall of Fame.

Jac Holzman was inducted into the non-performer category of the Rock and Roll Hall of Fame on March 14, 2011, with the induction speech given by Doors member John Densmore.

Personal life

Holzman is the father of Adam Holzman, a jazz-rock keyboardist who has played with Miles Davis; Jaclyn Easton, a writer and Internet entrepreneur; and Marin Sander-Holzman, an editor and filmmaker.

In 1973 he built a home in Hawaii, after having Elektra merged with Warner. The move was inspired by the movie The Holiday, where he spent most time reading instead of listening to music.

Works

See also 
 Follow the Music
 Elektra Sound Recorders

References

External links
 Word 152 - 2010-10-21 - David Hepworth talks to Jac Holzman, on Elektra's 60th. RSS feed
 Who is Jac Holzman?
 Blast from the Past Seeks Next Big Thing
 https://web.archive.org/web/20121102123659/http://www.digitalmusicforum.com/west/speakers09.shtml
 Becoming Elektra, Elektra’s early years by Mick Houghton
 Follow the Music - Holzman & Daws (paperback).
 Sound Opinions March 2011 interview with Holzman

American music industry executives
St. John's College (Annapolis/Santa Fe) alumni
American record producers
20th-century American Jews
Elektra Records
Nonesuch Records
Living people
1931 births
21st-century American Jews